The Biographie nationale de Belgique (French; "National Biography of Belgium") is a biographical dictionary of Belgium. It was published by the Royal Academy of Belgium in 44 volumes between 1866 and 1986. A continuation series, entitled the Nouvelle Biographie Nationale ("New National Biography"), has been published by the Royal Academy of Science, Letters and Fine Arts of Belgium since 1988. Both the Biographie nationale and Nouvelle biographie nationale were digitised by the Fonds InBev-Baillet Latour and can be freely consulted at the Academy's website.

A parallel biographical dictionary has been produced in Dutch since 1964, entitled the Nationaal Biografisch Woordenboek ("National Biographical Dictionary"). It places more emphasis on figures important to the history and culture of Flanders and is published by the Royal Flemish Academy of Belgium for Science and the Arts (with the co-operation of the Royal Academy of Dutch language and literature and the Royal Academy of Medicine of Belgium).

References

External links
Official website of the Biographie Nationale / Nouvelle Biographie Nationale (Royal Academy)
Index of the Biographie nationale
Home page of the Nationaal Biografisch Woordenboek

Belgium
Historiography of Belgium